The Francis Arnold House is a historic house in LeSauk Township, Minnesota, United States.  It was built in 1884 for the owner and operator of a gristmill that stood just west of the house, on the bank of the Sauk River just above its confluence with the Mississippi.  The Arnold House was listed on the National Register of Historic Places in 1994 for its local significance in the theme of industry.  It was nominated for symbolizing the family-owned, water-powered mills once common in rural Stearns County.

See also

 National Register of Historic Places listings in Stearns County, Minnesota

References

1884 establishments in Minnesota
Houses completed in 1884
Houses in Stearns County, Minnesota
Houses on the National Register of Historic Places in Minnesota
Italianate architecture in Minnesota
National Register of Historic Places in Stearns County, Minnesota